Malcolm Payne (born 13 June 1947), is a retired English academic and writer in the field of social work. He is best known for his  Modern social work theory textbook, which is in its fourth edition. He is an Adviser (Policy and Development)  at St Christophers Hospice, London,  Emeritus Professor of Community Studies, Manchester Metropolitan University, and Honorary Professor, Kingston University St Georges Medical School.

Books 
 
 (1993) Search: the social services and community care consultancy and training directory, 1993-4 . In BASW Trading.
 Payne M (1993) Linkages: effective networking in social care . In Whiting and Birch.

References

External links
 old blog
 current blog

1947 births
Academics of Manchester Metropolitan University
English social workers
Living people